The 1927 Gulang earthquake occurred at 6:32 a.m. on 22 May (22:32 UTC on 21 May). This 7.6 magnitude event had an epicenter near Gulang, Gansu in the Republic of China. There were 40,912 deaths. It was felt up to 700 km (435 mi) away.

Geology
The continental collision between the Indian Plate and the Eurasian Plate has formed the Himalayas and the large uplifted area of the Tibetan Plateau. The northeastern part of Tibet is affected by the eastward lateral spreading of the Tibetan Plateau. This spreading is accommodated by a series of sinistral (left-lateral) strike-slip faults, including the Altyn Tagh, Haiuyan, Kunlun and Xianshuihe faults, combined with thrusting on the Longmenshan fault. The earthquake ruptured the complex thrust fault system in the Qilian Mountains transpressional zone, formed at a restraining bend on the Haiyuan fault. Another segment of the Haiyuan fault was responsible for the 1920 Haiyuan earthquake.

Damage

In the area of greatest intensity, all cave dwellings and 90% of houses were destroyed. In Gulang, almost the only thing left standing was a 20 m (66 ft) long section of the city walls and some decorated archways. In Gulang county 4,000 people and 30,000 domestic animals were killed. In Wuwei, most of the city walls collapsed as did many temples, towers and civilian houses, 35,000 people and 200,000 horses and oxen were killed. In the area around Yongchang many primary schools, forts, stockaded villages and temples were destroyed, killing 809 people. In Shandan County more than 5,800 houses were destroyed and many cave dwellings collapsed, leaving 886 people dead.

The ground was extensively fissured, with fissures up to 14 km (8.7 mi) in length, 6–13 m (20–43 ft) wide and 7 m (23 ft) deep. A large landslide at Dongchuan buried several villages and blocked the road for a year.

Characteristics
The magnitude of this earthquake has been variously calculated as 7.6 on the moment magnitude scale and 8.0–8.3 on the surface wave magnitude scale. The surface rupture caused by the earthquake was 23 km (14 mi) long.

See also
 List of earthquakes in 1927
 List of earthquakes in China

References

External links

Earthquakes in Gansu
Gulang Earthquake, 1927
Gulang Earthquake, 1927